Erskine Douglas Sandford FRSE (31 July 1793–4 September 1861) was a 19th-century Scottish advocate and legal author.

Life
He was born at 22 South Frederick Street in Edinburgh's New Town, then a new house, on 31 July 1793 the son of Helen Frances Catherine Douglas and her husband, Bishop Daniel Sandford.

After studying law he passed the Scottish bar as an advocate in 1816.

In 1828 he was elected a Fellow of the Royal Society of Edinburgh his proposer being George Augustus Borthwick. At this time he was living with his family at 25 Heriot Row.

In 1828 he was involved in the trial of William Burke and Helen McDougal for the Burke and Hare Murders. When travelling on a mailcoach in 1829, he realised that one of his fellow passengers was in fact a disguised William Hare (who had been granted immunity from prosecution). This was one of the last reliable sightings of Hare, whose eventual fate is unknown.

In 1833 he replaced Adam Urquhart as Sheriff of Wigtown.

In 1837 he is listed as one of the few contributors to the Scottish Episcopal Fund, a fund begun in 1806 to establish the Scottish Episcopalian Church.

He lived his later life at 11 Randolph Crescent on the edge of the Moray Estate in western Edinburgh.

He died at Alvechurch Rectory on 4 September 1861.

Family
His uncles were Daniel Keyte Sandford and Francis Sandford, 1st Baron Sandford.

In 1829 he married Joanna Grace Graham (d.1890). They had two daughters and three sons.

He was uncle to Daniel Sandford (Bishop of Tasmania)

Publications

A Treatise on the History and Law of Entails in Scotland
A Treatise on the Law of Heritable Succession in Scotland

References

1793 births
1861 deaths
Lawyers from Edinburgh
Scottish lawyers
Fellows of the Royal Society of Edinburgh
Scottish legal writers